Zakariya is an Indian film director, screenwriter, actor and producer who works in Malayalam Films. Hailing from Valanchery,
Malappuram, Zakariya is best known for his directorial debut Sudani from Nigeria,
which won several awards and accolades. His second directorial feature was Halal Love Story.

Personal life

He is a postgraduate in Mass Communication and Journalism from SAFI Institute of Advanced Study, Vazhayur.
and worked as an assistant professor in MediaOne Academy at Calicut. He started
his career as an Assistant Director in an Advertising production house, TVC
Factory, Cochin, Kerala.

Filmography

Acting Roles

Awards

References

External links
 Zakariya Mohammed

Film directors from Kerala
Living people
1986 births